Lebaa,  is a  village in the Jezzine District of the South Governorate of Lebanon, about 53 km  south of Beirut.

History
In 1838, Eli Smith noted  Liba'ah, as a village located in "Aklim et-Tuffah, adjacent to Seida".

In 1875, Victor Guérin travelled in the area, and noted: "I cross a wady; then, climbing to the west of the slopes cultivated by terraces and planted with fig and olive trees, I stop for a few moments in Leba'a, a village divided into two quarters, whose population of 400 souls consists almost exclusively of Maronites. It must occupy the site of an ancient locality.

References

Bibliography

External links
Lebaa, localiban

Populated places in Jezzine District